"No Memories Hangin' Round" is a song written by Rodney Crowell, and recorded as a duet by American country music artists Rosanne Cash and Bobby Bare.  It was released in September 1979 as the first single from the album Right or Wrong.  The song reached number 17 on the Billboard Hot Country Singles & Tracks chart.

Chart performance

References

1979 singles
Rosanne Cash songs
Bobby Bare songs
Songs written by Rodney Crowell
Columbia Records singles
1979 songs
Song recordings produced by Rodney Crowell